

Collaborations with composers

Filmography

1950s
The music company in all 1950s films with Anand Bakshi's music was Saregama.

1960s
Films are sorted in alphabetical order by composer. All music companies are Saregama unless otherwise stated.

1970s

1980s

1990s

2000s

Indian filmographies
Discographies of Indian artists